Dalbir Singh Gill (born 25 November 1936) is a former Indian cyclist. He competed in the 1000m time trial, team pursuit and team time trial events at the 1964 Summer Olympics.

References

External links
 

1936 births
Living people
Indian male cyclists
Olympic cyclists of India
Cyclists at the 1964 Summer Olympics
Place of birth missing (living people)